Glow, the sixth full-length album by American guitarist Kaki King, was released October 9, 2012. On Glow King returns to her instrumental roots and is accompanied by the string quartet ETHEL. “This is a guitar record,” King says to describe this album. The first single, "Great Round Burn", is available to download at RollingStone.com.

Track listing

Critical reception

Writing for Allmusic, music critic Thom Jurek wrote "The sound on these pieces is crystalline, they are structured as brief, tightly constructed songs, with catchy, often ethereal melodies of varying tempo... The pristine sound is easy on the ear and easily appreciated. That said, it can sometimes detract from more organic surprises inherently written into these songs. But it's a small complaint given how much there is to enjoy here."

The album currently has a Metacritic rating of 68% based on six reviews from professional critics, indicating generally favorable reviews.

Personnel
Kaki King – guitars
ETHEL - string quartet (strings arranged and orchestrated by Ralph Farris and ETHEL)
Richmond Johnston - bagpipes

Production
D. James Goodwin – producer

References

Kaki King albums
2012 albums